An island council was the governing body of an island territory, an administrative level of the Netherlands Antilles until its dissolution.

Island councils existed for:
Aruba (until its secession from the Netherlands Antilles in 1986)
Bonaire
Curaçao
Saba
Sint Eustatius
Sint Maarten
The latter three were until 1 April 1983 governed by a single island council:
the Windward Islands

Dissolution of the Netherlands Antilles
Upon the dissolution of the Netherlands Antilles in 2010, the island councils of Sint Maarten and Curaçao have become the Estates of Sint Maarten and the Estates of Curaçao respectively. The island councils of Bonaire, Saba and Sint Eustatius (the Caribbean Netherlands), kept their name and became island councils of the special municipalities of the Netherlands.

References

Types of administrative division
Government of the Netherlands Antilles

nl:Eilandsraad#Eilandsraad in de Nederlandse Antillen